The Girls Singles tournament of the 2014 BWF World Junior Championships was held on April 13–18. The defending champion of the last edition is Akane Yamaguchi from Japan.

This year, Yamaguchi managed to defend her title after beating Chinese He Bingjiao 14-21, 21-18, 21-13 in the final. This also make the title won by Japanese 3 times in a row.

Seeded

  Akane Yamaguchi (champion)
  Busanan Ongbumrungpan (quarter-final)
  Pornpawee Chochuwong (quarter-final)
  Aya Ohori (semi-final)
  Mia Blichfeldt (fourth round)
  Ruthvika Shivani Gadde (third round)
  He Bingjiao (final)
  Liang Xiaoyu (quarter-final)
  Chen Yufei (third round)
  Alida Chen (second round)
  Ruselli Hartawan (fourth round)
  Luise Heim (second round)
  Nguyen Thuy Linh (fourth round)
  Maja Pavlinic (fourth round)
  Thamolwan Poopradubsil (second round)
  Qin Jinjing (semi-final)

Draw

Finals

Top Half

Section 1

Section 2

Section 3

Section 4

Bottom Half

Section 5

Section 6

Section 7

Section 8

References
Main Draw

2014 BWF World Junior Championships
2014 in youth sport